Events from the year 1651 in Spain.

Incumbents
 Monarch: Philip IV

Events
 July: Start of the Siege of Barcelona during the Reapers' War

Births
 Antonio Arbiol y Díez, Franciscan and painter (d. 1726)
 Manuel de Oms, 1st Marquis of Castelldosrius, diplomat, man of letters, Viceroy of Peru. (d. 1710)
 Cristóbal Hernández de Quintana, baroque painter  (d. 1725)
 July 12 – Margaret Theresa of Spain, Holy Roman Empress (d. 1673)
 December 25 - Pedro Manuel Colón de Portugal, 7th Duke of Veragua, (d. 1710)

Deaths
 Luis Quiñones de Benavente, entremesista 
 October 17 – Hernando de Lobo Castrillo, bishop of Puerto Rico

 
Years of the 17th century in Spain